The Greene-Lewis House is a historic home in Tallahassee, Florida. It is located at 535 West College Avenue. On June 11, 1998, it was added to the U.S. National Register of Historic Places.

References

External links
 Leon County listings at National Register of Historic Places
 Leon County listings at Florida's Office of Cultural and Historical Programs

Historic buildings and structures in Leon County, Florida
Houses on the National Register of Historic Places in Florida
National Register of Historic Places in Tallahassee, Florida
History of Tallahassee, Florida
Houses in Tallahassee, Florida
American Craftsman architecture in Florida